Kulwant Rana (born 5 December 1970) is a leader of Bharatiya Janata Party and a member of the Delhi Legislative Assembly. He has served as the Vice President of Bharatiya Janata Party, Delhi State.

After graduation he participated in social activities which are related to his helping nature of poor and needy persons.
He started taking part in active politics and got connected with all levels of persons to improve the political system.

In 1993, for the first time he became BJP Block President.

In 1998, he became BJP Kisan Morcha President of Bawana district and after that became Kisan Morcha President of Delhi State.

In 2003, for the first time he was elected as M.L.A. from B.J.P. as youngest M.L.A. of Assembly.

In 2008, he was again elected M.L.A. from B.J.P. with the highest winning percentage.

In 2013, he was elected M.L.A. from B.J.P. for a third time with good difference from the opponents. He is famous among the people for his hardworking attitude.

References

1970 births
Delhi MLAs 2013–2015
Living people
Place of birth missing (living people)
Bharatiya Janata Party politicians from Delhi